Subramania Iyer may refer to:

 G. Subramania Iyer (1855–1916), founder of The Hindu English language Indian newspaper.
 Sir S. Subramania Iyer, Indian Judge and founder of the Home Rule League.